The Geely BL is a sports coupe from Chinese manufacturer, Geely Automobile.

Overview

The "BL" name stands for "Beauty Leopard" which is the direct meaning of the Chinese name Meirenbao (美人豹). The car was designed with help from Daewoo and was introduced to production in January, 2003. It is best known outside China for being the first vehicle with an in-car karaoke machine. The car's design seems to be inspired mostly by the Toyota Celica, with the front taking inspiration from the Honda Integra and the rear from the Toyota Supra.

The Geely BL is considered a sports car in China, and it has a top speed of 180 km/h (approx 111 mph).

The Geely BL is powered by a 1.3 L engine which is a Toyota Motor Corporation design, produced by Xiali. Later in 2006, a version with a 1.8 L engine was added with the engine being the JL481Q 1.8 liter engine also used by the Maple Hysoul with a top speed of 190km/h.  

Production of the Geely BL ended in 2006.

References

External links
Official website of the BL

BL
Cars introduced in 2003
Coupés
Sports cars
Cars of China